Carex aematorhyncha is a species of flowering plant in the sedge family, Cyperaceae, native to South America. It was first formally named in 1854 in the sixth volume of Flora chilena.

Two are varieties are accepted:
Carex aematorhyncha var. aematorhyncha 
Carex aematorhyncha var. corralensis

References

aematorhyncha
Flora of South America